Robert Evan Schwarten (born 6 October 1954) is an Australian politician.

Early life 
Schwarten was born in Rockhampton, and is married with two sons.

Before his entry into politics, he was a teacher and a ministerial advisor to the Deputy Premier.

Political career 
From 1985 to 1991 he was an alderman on Rockhampton City Council. A member of the Labor Party, he was elected to the Legislative Assembly of Queensland in 1989 as the member for Rockhampton North, but was defeated in 1992.

In 1995 he was reelected to parliament, this time as the member for Rockhampton. He was Minister for Public Works and Information and Communication Technology in Anna Bligh's Labor Government.  He held the Public Works portfolio from 1998 to 2011. Schwarten stood down from Parliament and was replaced by Bill Byrne, who held the seat for Labor.

Incidents

2000 Labour Day incident
Schwarten drew national media attention when he was involved in a violent scuffle with Craig Brown, the husband of Federal MP Kirsten Livermore, following Rockhampton's Labour Day celebrations in May 2000.  Brown lodged a formal complaint with the Queensland Police Service alleging assault occasioning bodily harm, but the complaint was later withdrawn.  Premier Peter Beattie described the altercation between Schwarten and Brown as a "robust debate at a Labour Day function".  Following the incident, the state Labor government faced several days of the state opposition referring to the incident in Parliament Question Time, where the opposition alleged that the police were ready to charge Schwarten, but held off after learning that both Schwarten and Brown were due to meet with senior Australian Labor Party figures in an attempt to resolve the situation.

2010 restaurant incident
In July 2010, it was reported that Schwarten had become involved in a verbal stoush with other diners at a Rockhampton restaurant.  An unnamed customer had told media that Schwarten was swearing, shouting and threatening to fight other customers.  However, Schwarten claimed he was provoked.  He said while he and his wife Judy were sitting down to a meal, customers began being offensive, verbally attacking him, and upsetting his wife.  Judy Schwarten said that she was upset at the incident and claimed her husband had gone over to shake hands with the customers but they shoved him away.  The manager of the restaurant apologised to Schwarten following the incident.

2012 ramming incident
In January 2012, 62 year-old Brian John Hillier was charged with three counts of wilful damage after he used his vehicle to deliberately ram the home of Robert Schwarten in the Rockhampton suburb of Park Avenue, and the office of Kirsten Livermore in the Rockhampton CBD. Earlier, Hiller had also rammed another private residence in what was believed to be a case of mistaken identity as the house was located next door to a home belonging to someone with the surname, Livermore.

Police told the Rockhampton Magistrates Court that they had found handwritten notes in Hiller's vehicle of addresses and markings on a street map.  Police also said that discovered a litany of large, hand-written anti-government signage strewn along the front fence of Hiller's property at Rockyview, on the northern outskirts of Rockhampton.  Hiller applied for bail on 27 January 2012, which the police prosecutor opposed as police believed Hillier may have confronted Schwarten and Livermore under the guise of political activism.  The bail application was refused and Hiller was remanded in custody.  Queensland Premier, Anna Bligh condemned the actions of the man saying that his behaviour had no place in Australian democracy.

References

1954 births
Living people
Members of the Queensland Legislative Assembly
Australian Labor Party members of the Parliament of Queensland
21st-century Australian politicians